Amarna Letter EA4 is a continuation of correspondence between Kadašman-Enlil I and Amenhotep III.

The letter is part of a series of correspondences from Babylonia to Egypt, which run from EA2 to EA4 and EA6 to EA14. EA1 and EA5 are from Egypt to Babylonia.

In a publication of the Moran translations, the letter is given the title Royal deceit and threats.

The letter translated reads:

See also
Tammuz (Babylonian calendar)
Ab
Chronology of the ancient Near East
Amarna letters: EA 1, EA 2, EA 3, EA 5, EA 6, EA 7, EA 8, EA 9, EA 10, EA 11

References

Amarna letters